The Marico flycatcher or Mariqua flycatcher (Melaenornis mariquensis) is a passerine bird in the Old World flycatcher family Muscicapidae that is found in areas of southern Africa.

Taxonomy
The Marico flycatcher was previously placed in the genus Bradornis but was moved to Melaenornis based on the results of a molecular phylogenetic study published in 2010.

Range 
It is found in Angola, Botswana, Namibia, South Africa, Zambia and Zimbabwe.

Habitat 
Its natural habitat is dry savanna.

References

Marico flycatcher
Birds of Southern Africa
Marico flycatcher
Taxonomy articles created by Polbot
Taxobox binomials not recognized by IUCN